Labor history, labour history, Labor History or Labour History may refer to:

 Labor history (discipline), a subfield of the discipline of history
 Australian labour movement, including its history
 History of trade unions in the United Kingdom
 Labor history of the United States
 Labor History (journal), an American scholarly publication published by Routledge
Labour History (journal), an Australian scholarly journal published by the Australian Society for the Study of Labour History

See also
 Trade union
 Working class